Harriet Martineau (12 June 1802 – 27 June 1876) was an English social theorist often seen as the first female sociologist who's published material focused on race relations. She wrote from a sociological, holistic, religious and feminine angle, translated works by Auguste Comte, and, rarely for a woman writer at the time, earned enough to support herself. The young Princess Victoria enjoyed her work and invited her to her 1838 coronation. Martineau advised "a focus on all [society's] aspects, including key political, religious, and social institutions". She applied thorough analysis to women's status under men. The novelist Margaret Oliphant called her "a born lecturer and politician... less distinctively affected by her sex than perhaps any other, male or female, of her generation." Her lifelong commitment to the abolitionist movement has seen Martineau's celebrity and achievements remain particularly relevant  to  American institutions of higher learning such as  Northwestern University with its Methodist foundations.

Early life

Born in Norwich, England, Harriet Martineau was the sixth of the eight children of Thomas, her father who was a textile manufacturer.  A highly respected Unitarian, he was deacon of the Octagon Chapel, Norwich from 1797. Harriet's mother, Elizabeth Rankin was the daughter of a sugar refiner and grocer. Harriet's five older siblings included two sisters and three brothers. In age order their names were, Elizabeth, Thomas, Henry, Robert and Rachel Ann. Harriet's two younger siblings included her brother James who she was very close with, and the youngest of the eight, Ellen.

The Martineau family was of French Huguenot ancestry and professed Unitarian views. Her uncles included the surgeon Philip Meadows Martineau (1752–1829), whom she had enjoyed visiting at his nearby estate, Bracondale Lodge, and businessman and benefactor Peter Finch Martineau. Martineau was closest to her brother James, who became a philosopher and clergyman in the tradition of the English Dissenters. According to the writer Diana Postlethwaite, Harriet's relationship with her mother was strained and lacking affection, which contributed to views expressed in her later writing. Martineau claimed her mother abandoned her to a wet nurse.

Harriet's childhood was rather different compared to any other ordinary child. Her family was financially comfortable until around 1825-26 when the stock market and banking system collapsed. As previously mentioned Harriet and her mother's relationship was quite hostile early on. It was a traditional gesture for mothers to hire wet nurses for their children, especially if they could not nurse their child by themselves. However the specific wet nurse that Harriet's mother Elizabeth had hired for Harriet could not produce a sufficient amount of milk for an infant. This left Harriet starved for the first few weeks of her life, which is what Mrs. Martineau had attributed all of Harriet's future ailments to.

Harriet's ideas on domesticity and the "natural faculty for housewifery", as described in her book Household Education (1848), stemmed from her lack of nurture growing up. It was found that affection shown toward Harriet by her mother was quite rare. In fact, there have been findings that suggested that Harriet had imagined angels coming to take her away, which was thought to symbolize her wishing to find a way to escape her mother's reign through suicide.

Although their relationship was better in adulthood, Harriet saw her mother as the antithesis of the warm and nurturing qualities which she knew to be necessary for girls at an early age. Her mother urged all her children to be well read, but at the same time opposed female pedantics "with a sharp eye for feminine propriety and good manners. Her daughters could never be seen in public with a pen in their hand". Despite this conservative approach to raising girls, Martineau was not the only academically successful daughter in the family; her sister Rachel ran her own Unitarian Academy with artist Hilary Bonham Carter as one of her students. Martineau's mother strictly enforced proper feminine behavior, pushing her daughter to "hold a sewing needle" as well as the (hidden) pen.

Education 
In the Martineau family, Harriet's mother Elizabeth made sure all her children received a proper education. With the Martineaus being Unitarian, both the boys and girls in the family were expected to receive a conventional education. In order to abide by this well-rounded education, Harriet was taught at home by several of her elder siblings in the beginning of her education journey. Harriet was taught French by her mother, which was the predominant language spoken by her father. Thomas, her father, taught her Latin, and her brother Thomas taught Harriet math and writing. Unfortunately for Harriet, being taught at home especially by all her siblings often led to lots of mockery.

When she was nine years old Harriet transitioned to a small school run by a man named Mr. Perry. Mr. Perry was very special to Harriet, allegedly one of the first people in her life to provide her with a positive and non-judgmental learning environment. Later on in her life, Harriet claimed that Mr. Perry's school was the catalyst for her intellectual development and interest in education. As her education progressed she began to grow very fond of the following topics: Shakespeare, political economy, philosophy and history. Despite her love for all these topics, her mind was often dominated by the three biggest insecurities in her life: her hearing disability, her poor handwriting, and the look of her hair.

The next step in Harriet Martineau's education arised when she received an invitation from the all-girl boarding school that her Aunt and Uncle Kentish ran in Bristol. Besides the standardized course she took at the school, Harriet began her lifelong self-directed research here. She dove deep into topics on her own, such as Latin, Greek, Italian, and even took a deeper interest in the Bible. Up until her brother James, who was born when she was 3 years old, went off to college at the Manchester New College of York in 1821 (Harris Manchester College, Oxford), she did not write often. James and Harriet had a great relationship, so James had suggested that Harriet begin writing as a way to cope with their new separation.

Writing career 
Martineau began losing her senses of taste and smell at a young age. She was deaf and having to use an ear trumpet at the young age of 12. However, it was said that Harriet did not actually utilize the ear trumpet until her late twenties as she was trying to avoid harassment from others by doing so.  It was the beginning of many health problems in her life. With such an early onset of illness, and the passing of her father, requiring her to make a living for herself, she became an avid writer. In 1821 she began to write anonymously for the Monthly Repository, a Unitarian periodical, and in 1823 she published Devotional Exercises and Addresses, Prayers and Hymns.

The year 1823 was the same year that Harriet's brother James introduced her to one of his friends from school, John Hugh Worthington. The two were engaged, however never married as Worthington fell ill and passed away. Martineau later reveals in her autobiography that she was in a strange sense relieved in the long run that marriage was not an option, as their relationship was filled with stress and disagreements. Martineau remained unmarried in her life.

In 1829, the family's textile business failed. Martineau, then 27 years old, stepped out of the traditional roles of feminine propriety to earn a living for her family. Along with her needlework, she began selling her articles to the Monthly Repository, earning accolades, including three essay prizes from the Unitarian Association. Her regular work with the Repository helped establish her as a reliable and popular freelance writer.

In Martineau's Autobiography, she reflects on her success as a writer and her father's business failure, which she describes as "one of the best things that ever happened to us". She described how she could then "truly live instead of vegetate". Her reflection emphasizes her experience with financial responsibility in her life while she writes "[her] fusion of literary and economic narratives".

Harriet's first commissioned book, Illustrations of Political Economy, was a fictional tutorial intended to help the general public understand the ideas of Adam Smith. Illustrations was published in February 1832 in an edition of just 1500 copies, since the publisher assumed it would not sell well. Yet it very quickly became highly successful, and would steadily out-sell the work of Charles Dickens. Illustrations was her first work to receive widespread acclaim, and its success served to spread the free-market ideas of Adam Smith and others throughout the British Empire. Martineau then agreed to compose a series of similar monthly stories over a period of two years, the work being hastened by having her brother James also work on the series with her.

The subsequent works offered fictional tutorials on a range of political economists such as James Mill, Bentham and Ricardo, the latter especially forming her view of rent law. Martineau relied on Malthus to form her view of the tendency of human population to exceed its means of subsistence. However, in stories such as "Weal and Woe in Garvelock", she promoted the idea of population control through what Malthus referred to as "voluntary checks" such as voluntary chastity and delayed marriages.

London and the United States
In the early 19th century, most social institutions and norms were strongly shaped by gender, or the perception of what was appropriate for men versus for women. Writing was no exception; non-fiction works about social, economic and political issues were dominated by men, while limited areas, such as romance fiction, and topics dealing with domesticity were considered to be appropriate for women authors. Despite these gendered expectations in the literary world, Martineau strongly expressed her opinions on a variety of topics.

Martineau's frequent publication in the Repository acquainted her with editor Rev. William Johnson Fox (not William Darwin Fox, see disambiguation). First coming to London around 1830, she joined Fox's social circle of prominent thinkers which also introduced her to Erasmus Alvey Darwin, older brother to Charles Darwin.

In November 1832 Martineau moved to London. Among her acquaintances were: Henry Hallam, Harriet Taylor, Alexander Maconochie, Henry Hart Milman, Thomas Malthus, Monckton Milnes, Sydney Smith, John Stuart Mill, Edward Bulwer-Lytton, Elizabeth Barrett Browning, Sarah Austin, and Charles Lyell, as well as Jane Welsh Carlyle and Thomas Carlyle. She met Florence Nightingale, Charlotte Brontë, George Eliot and Charles Dickens later on in her literary career.

Until 1834 Martineau was occupied with her brother James on the political economy series, as well as a supplemental series of Poor Laws and Paupers Illustrated and Illustrations of Taxation which was intended to directly influence government policy. About the same time, she published four stories expressing support of the Whig Poor Law reforms. These tales (direct, lucid, written without any appearance of effort, and yet practically effective) display the characteristics of their author's style. Tory paternalists reacted by calling her a Malthusian "who deprecates charity and provision for the poor", while Radicals opposed her to the same degree. Whig high society fêted her.

In May 1834 Charles Darwin, on his expedition to the Galapagos Islands, received a letter from his sisters saying that Martineau was "now a great Lion in London, much patronized by Ld. Brougham who has set her to write stories on the poor Laws" and recommending Poor Laws and Paupers Illustrated in pamphlet-sized parts. They added that their brother Erasmus "knows her & is a very great admirer & every body reads her little books & if you have a dull hour you can, and then throw them overboard, that they may not take up your precious room".

Abolitionist
In 1834, after completing the economic series, Harriet Martineau paid a long visit to the United States during which she visited a great many people, some little known, others as famous as James Madison, the former US president, at his home at Montpelier. She also met numerous abolitionists in Boston and studied the emerging schools for the education of girls. Her support of abolitionism, then widely unpopular across the U.S., caused controversy, which her publication, soon after her return, of Society in America (1837) and How to Observe Morals and Manners (1838), only fueled. The two books are considered significant contributions to the then-emerging field of sociology.

In Society in America, Martineau angrily criticized the state of women's education. She wrote,

The publication of Harriet Martineau's Illustrations of Political Economy found public success. So much success that, "by 1834, the monthly sales . . . had reached 10,000 in a decade in which a sale of 2,000 or 3,000 copies of a work of fiction was considered highly successful."

Her article "The Martyr Age of the United States" (1839), in the Westminster Review, introduced English readers to the struggles of the abolitionists in America several years after Britain had abolished slavery.

In October 1836, soon after returning from the voyage of the Beagle, Charles Darwin went to London to stay with his brother Erasmus. He found him spending his days "driving out Miss Martineau", who had returned from her trip to the United States. Charles wrote to his sister, 
The Darwins shared Martineau's Unitarian background and Whig politics, but their father Robert was concerned that, as a potential daughter-in-law, she was too extreme in her politics. Charles noted that his father was upset by a piece in the Westminster Review calling for the radicals to break with the Whigs and give working men the vote "before he knew it was not [Martineau's], and wasted a good deal of indignation, and even now can hardly believe it is not hers". In early December 1836 Charles Darwin called on Martineau and may have discussed the social and natural worlds she was writing about in her book Society in America, including the "grandeur and beauty" of the "process of world making" she had seen at Niagara Falls. He remarked in a letter, Significantly, Martineau's earlier popularization of Thomas Malthus' theories of population control may have helped convince Charles to read Malthus, which provided the breakthrough ideas for his nascent theory of evolution.

In April 1838 Charles wrote to his older sister Susan that

Martineau wrote Deerbrook (1838), a three-volume novel published after her American books. She portrayed a failed love affair between a physician and his sister-in-law. It was considered her most successful novel. She also wrote The Hour and the Man: An Historical Romance (1841), a three-volume novel about the Haitian slave leader Toussaint L'Ouverture, who contributed to the island nation's gaining independence in 1804.

Newcastle and Tynemouth

In 1839, during a visit to Continental Europe, Martineau was diagnosed with a uterine tumor. She several times visited her brother-in-law, Thomas Michael Greenhow, who was a celebrated doctor in Newcastle upon Tyne, to try to alleviate her symptoms. On the last occasion she stayed for six months in the Greenhow family house at 28 Eldon Square. Immobile and confined to a couch, she was cared for by her mother until purchasing a house and hiring a nurse to aid her.

She next moved downriver to Tynemouth where she regained her health. She stayed at Mrs Halliday's boarding-house, 57 Front Street, for nearly five years from 16 March 1840. The establishment is still open as a guest house today, now named the "Martineau Guest House" in her honor.

The critic Diana Postlethwaite wrote of this period for Martineau: Her illness caused her to literally enact the social constraints of women during this time.

Martineau wrote a number of books during her illness, and a historical plaque marks this house. In 1841 she published a series of four novels for children, The Playfellow, comprising The Settlers at Home, The Peasant and the Prince, Feats on the Fiord, and The Crofton Boys. In 1844 she published Life in the Sickroom: Essays by an Invalid, an autobiographical reflection on invalidism. She wrote Household Education (1848), the handbook on the "proper" way to raise and educate children. Lastly, she began working on her autobiography. Completed much later, it included some hundred pages on this period. Notable visitors included Richard Cobden and Thomas and Jane Carlyle.

Life in the Sickroom is considered to be one of Martineau's finest works. It upset evangelical readers as they "thought it dangerous in 'its supposition of self-reliance'". This series of essays embraced traditional womanhood. Martineau dedicated it to Elizabeth Barrett, as it was "an outpouring of feeling to an idealized female alter ego, both professional writer and professional invalid- and utterly unlike the women in her own family". Written during a kind of public break from her mother, this book was Martineau's proclamation of independence.

At the same time, Martineau turned the traditional patient–doctor relationship on its head by asserting control over her space even in sickness. The sickroom was her space. Life in the Sickroom explained how to regain control even in illness. Alarmed that a woman was suggesting such a position in the power dynamic, critics suggested that, as she was an invalid, her mind must also be sick and the work was not to be taken seriously. British and Foreign Medical Review dismissed Martineau's piece on the same basis as the critics: an ill person cannot write a healthy work. They thought it was unheard of for a woman to suggest being in a position of control, especially in sickness. Instead, the Review recommended that patients follow "unconditional submission" to the advice of doctors. They disagreed with the idea that Martineau might hold any sort of "authority to Britain's invalids".

Expecting to remain an invalid for the rest of her life, Martineau delighted in the new freedom of views using her telescope. Across the Tyne was the sandy beach "where there are frequent wrecks — too interesting to an invalid... and above the rocks, a spreading heath, where I watch troops of boys flying their kites; lovers and friends taking their breezy walks on Sundays..." She expressed a lyrical view of Tynemouth:

During her illness, she for a second time declined a pension on the civil list, fearing to compromise her political independence. After publication of her letter on the subject, some of her friends raised a small annuity for her soon after.

In 1844 Martineau underwent a course of mesmerism, returning to health after a few months. There was national interest in mesmerism at this time. Also known as 'animal magnetism', it can be defined as a "loosely grouped set of practices in which one person influenced another through a variety of personal actions, or through the direct influence of one mind on another mind. Mesmerism was designed to make invisible forces augment the mental powers of the mesmeric object." She eventually published an account of her case in 16 Letters on Mesmerism, which caused much discussion. Her work led to friction with "the natural prejudices of a surgeon and a surgeon's wife" (i.e., her brother-in-law, Thomas Michael Greenhow and her sister, Elizabeth Greenhow, née Martineau).

Ambleside

In 1845 she left Tynemouth for Ambleside in the Lake District, where she designed herself and oversaw the construction of the house called The Knoll, Ambleside, where she spent the greater part of her later life. As Harriet was a single women and had no children, and it was believed that, "No true women, married or single, can be happy without some sort of domestic life; - without having somebody's happiness dependent on her" (Harriet 498). However this was not true for Harriet and her life, in fact she said for herself that, "my [her] owen ideal of an innocent and happy life was a house of my own among poor improvable neighbors, with young servants whom I [she] might train and attach to myself..." ( Harriet 498). She began house-hunting and the first house she looked at was not entirely perfect and did not have everything that she needed and was looking for. It was not until her friend, who went with her to view it has said it would be worth the money to build a house her own rather than pay for something she did not love. The next place Harriet was brought to look at was the land of a minister at Ambleside called the Knoll. Harriet ended up getting a great deal for the original plot of land and a bonus plot. The next task she took on was actually planning the layout of the house, which found very enjoyable. When the actual act of constructing came around, she and her contractor were on very good terms and understood each other's expectations, in terms of payment and time commitments. It was not until April 1846 that Harriet moved into her new house, which was later referred to as The Knoll at Ambleside in England.

Views on Religion, Philosophical Atheism, and Darwin 
1845 she published three volumes of Forest and Game Law Tales. In 1846, she resided with her elderly mother, Elizabeth, in Birmingham for some time, following which she then toured Egypt, Palestine and Syria with some friends. On her return she published Eastern Life, Present and Past (1848), in which she reports a breakthrough realization standing on a prominence looking out across the Nile and desert to the tombs of the dead, where "the deceased crossed the living valley and river" to "the caves of the death region" where Osiris the supreme judge "is to give the sign of acceptance or condemnation". Her summary: "the mortuary ideas of the primitive Egyptians, and through them, of the civilized world at large, have been originated by the everlasting conflict of the Nile and the Desert".

This epiphany changed the course of her life. Eastern Life expressed her concept that, as humanity passed through one after another of the world's historic religions, the conception of the deity and of divine government became at each step more and more abstract and indefinite. She believed the ultimate goal to be philosophic atheism, but did not explicitly say so in the book. She described ancient tombs, "the black pall of oblivion" set against the paschal "puppet show" in the Church of the Holy Sepulchre, and noted that Christian beliefs in reward and punishment were based on and similar to heathen superstitions. Describing an ancient Egyptian tomb, she wrote, "How like ours were his life and death!... Compare him with a retired naval officer made country gentleman in our day, and in how much less do they differ than agree!" The book's "infidel tendency" was too much for the publisher John Murray, who rejected it. Martineau's biographer, Florence Fenwick Miller, wrote that "all her best moral and intellectual faculties were exerted, and their action becomes visible, at one page or another" of this work. Eastern Life, Present and Past marked an important chapter in Martineau's life as it documented her move away from Unitarianism towards atheism, which was never fully achieved. This shifting of religiosity can best be seen in her instruction to travel with the hopes of gaining a historical understanding of holy places and in her critiques on biblical literalism, as influenced by Samuel Taylor Coleridge. Eastern Life, Present and Past is also important historically, as Billie Melman notes, it was the "first feminine travelogue proper that is not an account of a pilgrimage." In her doing so, Martineau's so-called "anti-pilgrimage" became an important point in the growth of female academia, as well as an addition to the growing field of Egyptology.

Martineau wrote Household Education in 1848, lamenting the state of women's education. She believed women had a natural inclination to motherhood and believed domestic work went hand in hand with academia for a proper, well-rounded education. She stated, "I go further than most persons... in desiring thorough practice in domestic occupations, from an early age, for young girls". She proposed that freedom and rationality, rather than command and obedience, are the most effectual instruments of education.

Her interest in schemes of instruction led her to start a series of lectures, addressed at first to the school children of Ambleside, but afterward extended to their parents at the request of the adults. The subjects were sanitary principles and practice, the histories of England and North America, and the scenes of her Eastern travels. At the request of the publisher Charles Knight, in 1849 she wrote The History of the Thirty Years' Peace, 1816–1846, an excellent popular history from the point of view of a "philosophical Radical". Martineau spanned a wide variety of subject matter in her writing and did so with more assertiveness than was expected of women at the time. She has been described as having an "essentially masculine nature". It was commonly thought that a "progressive" woman, in being progressive, was improperly emulating the qualities of a man.

Martineau's work included a widely used guide book to the Lake District, A Complete Guide to the English Lakes, published in 1855 and in its 4th edition by 1876. This served as the definitive guidebook for the area for 25 years, effectively replacing the earlier guide by William Wordsworth, and continued in common usage until the publication of Baddeley's Thorough Guide to the English Lake District in 1880.

Martineau edited a volume of Letters on the Laws of Man's Nature and Development, published in March 1851. Its epistolary form is based on correspondence between her and the self-styled scientist Henry G. Atkinson. She expounded the doctrine of philosophical atheism, which she thought the tendency of human belief. She did not deny a first cause but declared it unknowable. She and Atkinson thought they affirmed man's moral obligation. Atkinson was a zealous exponent of mesmerism. The prominence given to the topics of mesmerism and clairvoyance heightened the general disapproval of the book. Literary London was outraged by its mesmeric evolutionary atheism, and the book caused a lasting division between Martineau, her beloved brother, James who had become a Unitarian cleric, and some of her friends.

From 1852 to 1866, she contributed regularly to the Daily News, writing sometimes six leaders a week. She wrote over 1600 articles for the paper in total. It also published her Letters from Ireland, written during a visit to that country in the summer of 1852. For many years she was a contributor to the Westminster Review; in 1854 she was among financial supporters who prevented its closing down.

Martineau believed she had experienced psychosomatic symptoms and later benefits from mesmerism; this medical belief of the times related the uterus to emotions and hysteria. She had symptoms of hysteria in her loss of taste and smell. Her partial deafness throughout life may have contributed to her problems. Various people, including the maid, her brother, and Spencer T. Hall (a notable mesmerist) performed mesmerism on her. Some historians attribute her apparent recovery from symptoms to a shift in the positioning of her tumor so that it no longer obstructed other organs. As the physical improvements were the first signs of healing she had in five years and happened at the same time of her first mesmeric treatment, Martineau confidentially credited mesmerism with her "cure".

She continued her political activism during the late 1850s and 1860s. She supported the Married Women's Property Bill and in 1856 signed a petition for it organized by Barbara Bodichon. She also pushed for licensed prostitution and laws that addressed the customers rather than the women. She supported women's suffrage and signed Bodichon's petition in its favor in 1866.

In the early part of 1855, Martineau was experiencing heart disease. She began to write her autobiography, as she expected her life to end. Completing the book rapidly in three months, she postponed its publication until after her death, and lived another two decades. It was published posthumously in 1877.

When Darwin's book The Origin of Species was published in 1859, his brother Erasmus sent a copy to his old flame Harriet Martineau. At age 58, she was still reviewing from her home in the Lake District. From her "snow landscape", Martineau sent her thanks, adding that she had previously praised
Martineau supported Darwin's theory because it was not based in theology. Martineau strove for secularism stating, "In the present state of the religious world, Secularism ought to flourish. What an amount of sin and woe might and would then be extinguished." She wrote to her fellow Malthusian (and atheist) George Holyoake enthusing, "What a book it is! – overthrowing (if true) revealed Religion on the one hand, & Natural (as far as Final Causes & Design are concerned) on the other. The range & mass of knowledge take away one's breath." To Fanny Wedgwood (the wife of Hensleigh Wedgwood) she wrote,

Economics and social sciences
Harriet Martineau propounds political economic theories in Illustrations of Political Economy. She is seen as a frontrunner who merges fiction and economy in a time period when "fiction claimed authority over emotional knowledge, while economics claimed authority over empirical knowledge". Moreover, Martineau's text sets the stage for women to enter into economics. For example, Dalley Lana explains that "by bringing the topic of domestic economy to bear on political economy, Martineau places women more centrally within economic theory and practice. In this context, women – as readers of the Illustrations and as characters with the tales – are not only rendered a part of larger-scale economics but also (because of their participation) encourage to learn the principles of political economy."

As early as 1831, Martineau wrote on the subject "Political Economy" (as the field of economics was then known). Her goal was to popularize and illustrate the principles of laissez faire capitalism, though she made no claim to original theorizing.

Martineau's reflections on Society in America, published in 1837, are prime examples of her sociological methods. Her ideas in this field were set out in her 1838 book How to Observe Morals and Manners. She believed that some very general social laws influence the life of any society, including the principle of progress, the emergence of science as the most advanced product of human intellectual endeavor, and the significance of population dynamics and the natural physical environment.

Auguste Comte coined the name sociology and published a lengthy exposition under the title of Cours de Philosophie Positive in 1839. Martineau undertook a concise translation that was published in two volumes in 1853 as The Positive Philosophy of Auguste Comte (freely translated and condensed by Harriet Martineau). It was a remarkable achievement, and a successful one; Comte recommended her volumes to his students instead of his own. Some writers regard Martineau as the first female sociologist. Her introduction of Comte to the English-speaking world and the elements of sociological perspective in her original writings support her credit as a sociologist.

Death

Harriet Martineau died of bronchitis at "The Knoll" on 27 June 1876, aged 74. She was buried alongside her mother in Key Hill Cemetery, Hockley, Birmingham. The following April, at Bracondale, her cousin's estate, much of Martineau's extensive art collection was sold at auction.

Harriet had a unique view on death, she said, "...I have not acquired any dread or dislike of death; but I have felt, for the first, time a keen and unvarying relish of life." (Harriet 483). She explained how that, as she knew death was approaching, day by day she was not scared of it or dreading it, in fact she even described how she did not let this knowledge impact her daily life activities.

Memorial
Her name is listed on the east face of the Reformers Memorial in Kensal Green cemetery in London.

Legacy
She left an autobiographical sketch to be published by the Daily News, in which she wrote:

In 1877 her autobiography was published. It was rare for a woman to publish such a work, let alone one secular in nature. Her book was regarded as dispassionate, "philosophic to the core" in its perceived masculinity, and a work of necessitarianism. She deeply explored childhood experiences and memories, expressing feelings of having been deprived of her mother's affection, as well as strong devotion to her brother James Martineau, a theologian.

Anthony Giddens and Simon Griffiths argue that Martineau is a neglected founder of sociology and that she remains important today. She taught that study of the society must include all its aspects, including key political, religious and social institutions, and she insisted on the need to include the lives of women. She was the first sociologist to study such issues as marriage, children, religious life, and race relations. Finally, she called on sociologists to do more than just observe, but also work to benefit the society.

In February 2014, it was reported that London's National Portrait Gallery held several portraits of Harriet, whose great nephew, Francis Martineau Lupton, was the great–great–grandfather of Catherine, Duchess of Cambridge, the gallery's patron. Harriet was close to her niece Frances Lupton, who worked to open up educational opportunities for women.

One of Harriet's most popular works of fiction was Deerbrook. The book drew lots of attention because it focused on the idea of domestic realism. Harriet's ideas in the novel were inspired by the works of David Hartley. This novel in particular was different from her other works as her development was evident. Her development included both her improvement of fictional writing, but also showed mastery of the theories she wrote about.

Books

Illustrations of taxation; 5 volumes; Charles Fox, 1834
Illustrations of Political Economy; 9 volumes; Charles Fox, 1834
Miscellanies; 2 volumes; Hilliard, Gray and Co., 1836
Society in America; 3 volumes; Saunders and Otley, 1837; (reissued by Cambridge University Press, 2009); Internet Archive
Retrospect of Western Travel; Saunders and Otley, 1838, (Project Gutenberg Volume 1, Volume 2)
How to Observe Morals and Manners; Charles Knight and Co, 1838; Google Books, Project Gutenberg
Deerbrook; London, 1839; Project Gutenberg
The Hour and the Man: An Historical Romance, 1841, Project Gutenberg
The Playfellow (comprising The Settlers at Home, The Peasant and the Prince, Feats on the Fiord, and The Crofton Boys); Charles Knight, 1841
Life in the Sickroom, 1844
The Billow and the Rock, 1846
Household Education, 1848, Project Gutenberg
Eastern Life. Present and Past; 3 volumes; Edward Moxon, 1848
The History of the Thirty Years' Peace, A.D. 1816–1846 (1849)
Feats on the Fiord. A Tale of Norway; Routledge, Warne, & Routledge, 1865, Project Gutenberg
Harriet Martineau's Autobiography. With Memorials by Maria Weston Chapman; 2 volumes; Smith, Elder & Co, 1877; Liberty Fund.
A Complete Guide to the English Lakes; John Garnett 1855 and later editions
H. G. Atkinson and H. Martineau, Letters on the Laws of Man's Nature and Development; Chapman, 1851 (reissued by Cambridge University Press, 2009)
A. Comte, tr. H. Martineau, The Positive Philosophy of Auguste Comte; 2 volumes; Chapman, 1853 (reissued by Cambridge University Press, 2009)

Archives
The Cadbury Research Library (University of Birmingham) holds three archive collections concerning Harriet Martineau: her papers and correspondence, letters additional, and the Martineau family papers.

See also
History of feminism
List of sociologists
List of suffragists and suffragettes

Notes

References
Fenwick Miller, Harriet Martineau (1884, "Eminent Women Series")

Paul L. Riedesel, "Who Was Harriet Martineau?", Journal of the History of Sociology, vol. 3, 1981. pp. 63–80
Robert K. Webb, Harriet Martineau, a Radical Victorian, Heinemann, London 1960
Gaby Weiner, "Harriet Martineau: A reassessment (1802–1876)", in Dale Spender (ed.), Feminist Theorists: Three Centuries of Key Women Thinkers, Pantheon 1983, pp. 60–74 

Attribution

Further reading
Chapman Maria Weston, Autobiography, with Memorials (1877). Virago, London 1983
Brian Conway and Michael R. Hill, 2009 Harriet Martineau and Ireland. In: Social Thought on Ireland in the Nineteenth Century. University College Dublin Press, Dublin, pp. 47–66. 

Ella Dzelzainis and Cora Kaplan, eds. Harriet Martineau: Authorship, Society, and Empire (Manchester University Press, 2011); 263 pp.; essays on her views of race, empire, and history, including the 1857 Indian Mutiny and the Atlantic slave trade
Lana L. Dalley, "On Martineau's Illustrations of Political Economy, 1832–34." BRANCH: Britain, Representation and Nineteenth-Century History, ed. Dino Franco Felluga. Extension of Romanticism and Victorianism on the Net. Web. Essay on Martineau's burgeoning career as a writer, which demarcates a time period economical upheaval
Shelagh Hunter, Harriet Martineau: The Poetics of Moralism. Scolar Press: 1995
Valerie Kossew Pichanick, Harriet Martineau: The Woman and Her Work, 1802–76. University of Michigan Press: 1980
Vera Wheatley, The Life and Work of Harriet Martineau. Essential Books: 1957

External links

Martineau Society (.co.uk)
Essays by Harriet Martineau, Quotidiana.org
The positive philosophy of Auguste Comte / freely translated and condensed by Harriet Martineau, Cornell University Library Historical Monographs Collection.

Guide to the Harriet Martineau Papers, The Bancroft Library
Papers of Harriet Martineau are held at The Women's Library at the Library of the London School of Economics, ref 7HRM
Retrospect of Western Travel by Harriet Martineau, 1838
Harriet Martineau, spartacus-educational.com

Letters from Harriet Martineau mainly to Sarah Martineau at Cumbria Archive Centre, Kendal

1802 births
1876 deaths
19th-century atheists
19th-century British philosophers
19th-century British translators
19th-century British women scientists
19th-century British writers
19th-century British economists
19th-century English women writers
British atheism activists
British classical liberals
British women essayists
Burials at Key Hill Cemetery
Classical economists
English deaf people
Deaf writers
English abolitionists
English atheists
English people of French descent
English sociologists
English suffragists
English translators
English Unitarians
English women philosophers
Feminism and history
People from Ambleside
Writers from Norwich
Positivists
Structural functionalism
Victorian novelists
Victorian women writers
British women sociologists
Works originally published in Once a Week (magazine)
Martineau family
Scientists with disabilities